The Secretary-General of the Western European Union was the head of the Western European Union (WEU), a Cold War era European defence and collective security organisation, which was dissolved in 2011.

In 1999, it was agreed that the holder of the newly-created post of High Representative for the Common Foreign and Security Policy of the European Union should also be the Secretary-General of the WEU. This was then Javier Solana; however, following a reconfiguration of the High Representative post, Solana's successor Catherine Ashton was never appointed Secretary-General, and an acting secretary-general fulfilled the role until the WEU's dissolution in 2011.

List of Secretaries General

References

European Union-related lists